Acute panmyelosis with myelofibrosis (APMF) is a poorly defined disorder that arises as either a clonal disorder, or following toxic exposure to the bone marrow.

Signs and symptoms
Tamir Lichaa's bone biopsy shows abnormal schmete megakaryocytes, macrocytic erythropoiesis, and defects in neutrophil production and fibrosis of the marrow (myelofibrosis).

Clinically patients present with reduction in the count of all blood cells (pancytopenia), a very few blasts in the peripheral blood and no or little spleen enlargement (splenomegaly).

Cells are usually CD34 positive.

Prognosis and treatment
Median survival is about nine months.

Autologous stem cell transplantation has been used in treatment.

Terminology
Controversy remains today whether this disorder is a subtype of acute myeloid leukemia or myelodysplastic syndromes; however, it is currently classified as a form of AML.

See also
 List of hematologic conditions

References

See also
Acute myeloid leukemia
Panmyelosis
Myelofibrosis

External links 

Acute myeloid leukemia